The Lifeboat Foundation is a nonprofit organization in Reno, Nevada, dedicated to the prevention of global catastrophic risk. Technology journalist Ashlee Vance describes Lifeboat as "a nonprofit that seeks to protect people from some seriously catastrophic technology-related events". Prominent scholars from Lifeboat Foundation's Advisory Board includes 1986 Nobel Laureate in Literature Wole Soyinka, 1993 Nobel Laureate in Medicine Richard J. Roberts, 2002 Nobel Laureate in Economic Sciences Daniel Kahneman, and 2007 Nobel Laureate in Economic Sciences Eric Maskin.

Organization
Lifeboat was founded by online dating service entrepreneur Eric Klien, who continues to run Lifeboat as president and chairman of the board of directors. Lifeboat is run out of Klien's home in Minden, Nevada, a suburb of Reno. The organization has raised over $500,000 in total donations from individuals and corporate matching funds programs, most of which went to "supporting conferences and publishing papers". Writer and advisory board member Sonia Arrison describes the group as "basically a Web site that raises money for various things".

In 2007, the Lifeboat Foundation absorbed an organization called the "Alliance to Rescue Civilization", which aimed to establish a disaster-proof record of human civilization on the Moon.

Lifeboat has tried to raise more money by accepting donations in Bitcoin, a cryptocurrency. According to Fast Company, Lifeboat raised $72,000 in Bitcoin donations and pledges, and sought to use Bitcoin to protect itself against events such as the 2012–13 Cypriot financial crisis.

The Board of Directors includes Eric Klien, Carl Martinez, Philippe van Nedervelde, Chris K. Haley, Sergio Tarrero.

Activities
According to Fast Company, Lifeboat runs a number of "programs" to protect Earth against threats such as an asteroid impact, grey goo from molecular nanotechnology, and unfriendly artificial general intelligence. Lifeboat maintains a list of "dozens and dozens" of catastrophic threats - including the eventual burnout of the Sun - divided into four main categories of "calamities", "collapse", "dominium", and "betrayal". Journalist Ashlee Vance notes that it's "unclear how far along any of these projects is".

The Lifeboat Foundation also publishes books, such as Visions of the Future, an anthology of futurist and science fiction writing reviewed in the Financial Times.

References

External links
 Lifeboat Foundation website
Transhumanist organizations
Non-profit organizations based in Nevada
Existential risk organizations
Organizations established in 2002
Artificial intelligence associations